Vindobona was an ancient Celtic settlement on what is now the site of Vienna, Austria. For the modern city, see Vienna.

Vindobona may also refer to:

231 Vindobona, an asteroid
Vindobona (train), a passenger rail service operated jointly by České dráhy and Austrian Federal Railways

See also

Vin Di Bona (born 1944), an American television producer